Live from Paris may refer to:
Live from Paris (U2 album)
Live from Paris (Shakira album)

See also
Live in Paris (disambiguation)